Bellefonte Airport (FAA LID N96) is a privately owned and operated airport in Bellefonte, Pennsylvania. It serves as a general aviation airport in the State College metropolitan area.

History
Bellefonte Airport was founded in 1971 by Robert Elnitski as a private airfield, and other than short periods in the 1990s has been a private airport since. It sits just over three miles from University Park Airport which serves as the major airport for Centre County.

See also 

 List of airports in Pennsylvania
 Aviation in Pennsylvania

References

External links 

 Official Airport website
 Bellefonte Airport at PennDOT.gov
 Bellefonte Airport at AOPA
 

Airports in Pennsylvania
Airports established in 1971